Jason Nidorf "Max" Mutchnick (born November 11, 1965) is an American television producer. He has received an Emmy Award, a People's Choice Award, and several Golden Globe Award nominations.

Early life and education
Mutchnick was born in Chicago, Illinois, and raised in Beverly Hills by his single mother, who is Jewish. He graduated from Emerson College  in 1987.

Career
Mutchnick's career in Hollywood started when he began writing for game shows and the sitcoms Good Advice and The Wonder Years. Along with David Kohan, he created Boston Common and Will & Grace. Mutchnick produced and wrote for Good Morning, Miami, and produced Twins and Four Kings, also with Kohan. The title characters of Will & Grace, Will Truman and Grace Adler, are based on Mutchnick and his best friend, Janet. Mutchnick, like Will Truman, is openly gay. He and Kohan have a production company, KoMut Entertainment, which is a combination of their two last names.

On June 7, 2006, Emerson College announced the naming of the Max Mutchnick Campus Center following Mutchnick's donation of a major financial gift. A recreation of the on-set apartment of characters Will Truman and Grace Adler was placed on display in the Emerson College Library until the 2013 completion of Emerson's Los Angeles Campus, to which place it was relocated.

Mutchnick and Kohan created a half-hour comedy series for CBS called Partners in 2012, but was canceled that same year.

Personal life
Mutchnick married his husband, lawyer Erik Hyman, on October 25, 2008. The couple are fathers to twin girls born in 2008 via a surrogate.

Filmography

References

External links

1965 births
Living people
Television producers from California
Emerson College alumni
Jewish American writers
LGBT Jews
LGBT people from California
LGBT people from Illinois
LGBT producers
People from Beverly Hills, California
Showrunners
Screenwriters from California
Writers from Chicago
Television producers from Illinois
American male television writers
21st-century American Jews
Screenwriters from Illinois
20th-century American screenwriters
20th-century American male writers
20th-century American Jews
21st-century American screenwriters
21st-century American male writers
American LGBT screenwriters